Élton Giovanni Machado (born 3 September 1983) is a Brazilian professional footballer who plays for Brasil de Pelotas.

Career
Born in Porto Alegre, Giovanni began his career with hometown club Grêmio, before moving to Santos. He signed for Spanish side Deportivo Alavés in November 2005, in a contract which began in January 2006. He later played back in Brazil for Figueirense and Atlético Mineiro before moving to Bahia. On 29 April 2010 the Brazilian midfielder, he signed a deal with Clube Náutico Capibaribe between the end of season, the last year played in Bahia.

References

External links

1983 births
Living people
Brazilian footballers
Deportivo Alavés players
Esporte Clube Bahia players
Clube Atlético Mineiro players
Grêmio Foot-Ball Porto Alegrense players
Santos FC players
Clube Náutico Capibaribe players
Figueirense FC players
Fortaleza Esporte Clube players
Association football midfielders
Footballers from Porto Alegre